The United Cup of Champions is an international annual basketball tournament for club teams in the Central Americas and Northern America. The league is traditionally held with 6 teams over a period of a week in the Gran Arena del Cibao in Santiago, the capital of the Dominican Republic.

History 
The United Cup was first played in 2014.

In the United Cup's second season, in 2015, six teams for the Dominican Republic and the United States participated. The GIE Maile Matrix were the inaugural champions after finishing the season with a 3–1 record and beating GUG in the finals. In the 2016, Academia de La Montana de Medellin from Colombia joined the league. In 2019, the HAB Caicos Sonics from the Turks and Caicos Islands made their debut in the league. In 2019, Fenix Santiago from Guatemala and the Tonga national team played in the United Cup. The following year, in 2020, the Chiba Seals from Japan joined. The 2022 saw the United Kingdom's Sheffield Bulldogs join the competition as well as the Correcaminos UAT Victoria from Mexico, who immediately won the title.

The 2023 season will take place from January 10 to January 13, 2023, with teams from a record 5 countries (those being Belize, Canda, Dominican Republic, United States and Costa Rica). The national teams from Belize and Costa Rica represented their countries.

Current teams

Champions

References 

Basketball competitions in South America
Basketball competitions in Central America
Basketball competitions in North America